Marjolijn Both (born 9 September 1971) is a former synchronized swimmer from The Netherlands.

References 

1971 births
Living people
Dutch synchronized swimmers
Olympic synchronized swimmers of the Netherlands
Synchronized swimmers at the 1992 Summer Olympics
Synchronized swimmers at the 1991 World Aquatics Championships
Swimmers from Amsterdam